TLK may refer to:

Talakan Airport (IATA code TLK), eastern Siberia, Russia
Terrace Ledge Kink, a model in surface science
The Latin Kings (hip hop group), a Swedish hip hop group
The Lion King, an animated film
Transformers: The Last Knight, a 2017 film
Tuas Link MRT station (MRT station abbreviation TLK), Tuas, Singapore
Twoje Linie Kolejowe (formerly Tanie Linie Kolejowe), a brand of train services in Poland run by PKP Intercity